ΧyMTeΧ is a macro package for TeX which renders high-quality chemical structure diagrams. Using the typesetting system, the name is styled as XϒMTeX. Molecules are defined by TeX markup.

Example
The following code produces the image for corticosterone below.
\documentclass{letter}
\usepackage{epic,carom}
\pagestyle{empty}
\begin{document}
\begin{picture}(1000,500)
   \put(0,0){\steroid[d]{3D==O;{{10}}==\lmoiety{H$_{3}$C};{{13}}==\lmoiety{H$_{3}$C};{{11}}==HO}}
   \put(684,606){\sixunitv{}{2D==O;1==OH}{cdef}}
\end{picture}
\end{document}

See also
 PPCHTeX (PPCHTeX)
 Molecule editor
 List of TeX extensions

References

External links
 Shonan Institute of Chemoinformatics and Mathematical Chemistry
 XyMTeX for Drawing Chemical Structures  — Download of XyMTeX Version 5.01 (the latest version: 2013-09-01) and its manuals.
 XyMTeX for Drawing Chemical Structures  — Download of XyMTeX Version 5.01 (the latest version: 2013-09-01) and its manuals.
 The Comprehensive TeX Archive Network (CTAN)
 The TeX Catalogue Online, Entry for XyMTeX, CTAN Edition (Version 4.06)
 WikiTeX now includes support for XyMTeX directly in Wiki articles.
 UPDATE 1: Original WikiTeX link (above) is not working. It's returning the error 403 Forbidden (tested in 2022-12-08)
 UPDATE 2: There still exists a WikiTeX official website consisting of a single-page presentation at WikiTeX.org but the download and repository's links are not working (tested in 2022-12-08)
 OPTIONAL 1: Sourceforge: Project's version 1.1 beta 3 (last update in 2013-03-21)
 OPTIONAL 2: GitHub: Forked from SourceForge (above link) in 2018-09-27

 TeX Users Group (TUG)
 The PracTeX Journal
 LaTeX Tools for Life Scientists (BioTeXniques?)  — An article that discusses XyMTeX.

Free TeX software
Chemistry software
Science software